A Christmas Without Snow is a 1980 American made-for-television drama film directed by John Korty and starring Michael Learned and John Houseman. The film was broadcast on CBS on December 9, 1980.

Plot
A divorcee, Zoe Jensen (Michael Learned), moves to San Francisco from Omaha in an effort to rebuild her life. She has reluctantly left her young son back home with his grandmother until she is more financially secure. She joins a local church choir which has just gained a new, demanding choirmaster, retired music conductor Ephraim Adams (John Houseman). Adams challenges the choir to dramatically improve, creating discomfort for some of the members, particularly when he sets the high goal of performing Handel's Messiah for a Christmas concert. Meanwhile, the choir overcome setbacks as they all deal with personal issues.

A teacher by profession, Zoe soon learns no positions are available and that she lacks training to perform more readily-available work. Living in an inexpensive apartment, she brushes up her typing skills in order to gain employment before her mother wearies of looking after her son, who is growing anxious from his separation from Zoe.

Zoe receives her grounding at church, where an assortment of inner-city residents range from a former opera singer to a student seeking to educate himself for a life in a profession. The opera singer falls by the wayside when ego gets in her way, while the student is falsely accused of vandalism to the church organ simply because of his race, yet is vindicated by those who know and believe in him. Together, they persevere in the church choir. Along the way, Zoe finds an office job and, with the help of a bargain hunter, prepares a pleasant home for her son and herself.

Unexpected talent abounds within the choir. The amateurs give their best as ones who perform for the love of the music. This love extends far beyond the choir loft and is exemplified when the choir members band together to make the needed repairs to the organ pipes.

At a pre-performance holiday dinner the choir sees a different side of Ephraim Adams as he presents gifts to the choir members and joins in the merriment. Weakness suddenly overtakes him and he collapses; at a local hospital it is determined he has had a stroke.

The choir performs Messiah admirably at the Christmas concert, accompanied by the vintage organ, with Adams in attendance in a wheelchair. The choir has progressed far beyond an unlikely group of city dwellers. They have become a family.

Cast 
 Michael Learned as Zoe Jensen
 John Houseman as Ephraim Adams
 Ramon Bieri as Henry Quist
 James Cromwell as Reverend Lohman
 Valerie Curtin as Muriel
 David Knell as Terry
 Calvin Levels as Wendell
 Ruth Nelson as Inez
 Beah Richards as Wendell's Grandma
 William Swetland as Hartley
 Ed Bogas as Seth
 Daisietta Kim as Maisie Kim
 Joy Carlin as Cora Newman
 Anne Lawder as Evangeline Burns
 Barbara Tarbuck as Carol Thorpe
 Roberta Callahan as Alice Lohman
John Patton as Mr. Jefferson
 Gail MacGowan as Alto soloist
 Will Connolly as Bass soloist
 Jane Frasier-Smith as Mrs. Dienhart
 H. Leonard Richardson as Mr. Hitchrick
 Matthew Hautau as Robbie
 Sterling Lim as Arthur Kim
 Jay Krohnengold as Mr. Goodman
 Barbara Squier as Ms. Meyers
 Lou Picetti as Mr. Loop
 Will Marchetti as Dan Garner
William Browder as Bride's father
 Joe Bellan as Taxi driver
Stephanie Smith as Waitress
 Carol McElheney as Office worker
 Steve Prescott Jones as Man in office
 Mark Anger as Doctor
 Dan Leegant as Sergeant
 Tony Dario as Detective West
 Yule Caise as Tough youth
Kevin Harris as Tough youth
 Robert Rivers as Tough youth

Soundtrack 
 "Messiah" by George Frideric Handel

See also 
 List of Christmas films

External links 
 
 

1980 television films
1980 films
1980s Christmas drama films
American Christmas drama films
Christmas television films
1980s English-language films
CBS network films
Films set in San Francisco
American drama television films
Films directed by John Korty
1980s American films